Jay I. Kislak (June 6, 1922 – October 3, 2018)  was an American businessman, philanthropist, bibliophile, and aviator.

Early life and education
Kislak was born in Hoboken, New Jersey on June 6, 1922. He earned his first real estate license in high school at the Newark Academy in Livingston, New Jersey. He attended and graduated from the Wharton School of the University of Pennsylvania, where he majored in economics.

Upon graduation, he served as a U.S.Navy aviator in World War II. In 1945, Kislak returned to New Jersey to enter the family real estate business full-time. In the early 1950s, Kislak moved his family to Miami, where established one of the country's largest privately-held mortgage banks, originating and servicing loans nationally for over 40 years. He served as chairman of the Kislak Organization.

From 1984 to 2020, the Kislak Foundation's philanthropic giving was focused on rare books, art, and historic documents. Many of the items in the collection have been donated to the Library of Congress and several university libraries.

Philanthropy

National Air and Space Museum
The Smithsonian Institution's National Air and Space Museum in Washington, D.C. received $10 million from the Kislak Family Foundation to support the creation of the new "World War II in the Air" exhibition. It will be named the "Jay I. Kislak World War II in the Air" gallery. The gallery will explore how World War II transformed aviation and warfare and inaugurated a new era in military aviation. Flying was a family legacy  and Kislack celebrated his 95th birthday on the USS Intrepid (CV-11) aircraft carrier.

Library of Congress donations
In 2022, the Kislak Family Foundation donated $10 million to the Library of Congress in Washington, D.C. to create a gallery exploring the history of the early Americas.

Kislak first donated nearly 4,000 items from his collection to the Library of Congress in 2004. This included rare masterpieces of indigenous art, maps, manuscripts, and cultural treasures documenting more than a dozen Native cultures and the earliest history of the Americas. In 2018, the Library of Congress appointed the first Jay I. Kislak Chair for the Study of the History and Cultures of the Early Americas.

Sothebys auction
Jay I. Kislak's substantial collection extended far beyond the nearly 4,000 items he donated to the Library of Congress. His collection included impressionist, modernist, and contemporary art and prints, photographs, designs, books and manuscripts. Sotheby’s departments are currently consigning many of works from the collection, including Richard Diebenkorn’s Berkeley Six, Raoul Dufy’s Les Martigues, Mary Cassatt’s Girl in a Hat with a Black Ribbon, Diego Giacometti’s Hommage à Böcklin console, William Bourne’s A Regiment for the Sea and Daniel Giraud Elliot’s Monograph of the Felidae or Family of Cats.

In addition to the Library of Congress, Kislak donated to multiple institutions of higher learning, including the University of Miami, Miami Dade College, Florida State University, the University of Pennsylvania, and the University of Florida.

Kislak Center at the University of Miami and Freedom Tower at Miami Dade College
The Kislak Center at the University of Miami Libraries  was established with original source materials related to the history of the early Americas.

The gift established a partnership between the University of Miami and Miami Dade College.

Kislak Center at the University of Pennsylvania Libraries
Jay I. Kislak and the Kislak Family Foundation donated $5.5 million to the Pennsylvania State University Libraries to complete the renovation of the 5th and 6th floors of the Van Pelt-Dietrich Library Center and also contributed to ongoing Kislak Center programming. Additionally, Kislak gifted the Penn State Libraries books from the library of Jacques Auguste de Thou.

Kislak Family Foundation Artist/Writer in Residence at the University of Florida
The Center for Latin American Studies at the University of Florida received a donation from the Kislak Family Foundation to establish an artist/writer in residence program. The program funds a visiting artist or writer who teaches courses, conducts workshops, delivers lectures, and tutors students on the main Gainesville campus.  The program's purpose is to bring preeminence to the University of Florida in the field of Latin American art and expose the campus community to works of art and literature.

In 2022, Gabriela Alemán was the first selected Kislak Family Foundation Artist/Writer in Residence.

Kislak Real Estate Institute at Monmouth University
In 2006, on the 100th anniversary of the Kislak Real Estate Company, a seven-figure donation was made to Monmouth University in West Long Branch, New Jersey, which named its Real Estate Institute for Kislak.

Honors and recognitions
In recognition of his efforts to preserve cultural heritage, Kislak was appointed by President George W. Bush to head U.S. Department of State's Cultural Property Advisory Committee from 2003 through 2008. In 2013, Kislak received the Encomienda of the Order of Merit Civil from the King of Spain, among other awards and appointments. In 2017 he was awarded the Lifetime Achievement Award from the Association of Fundraising Professionals.

Kislak and his family were among the 25 founding families of Temple Beth Am in Pinecrest, Florida, one of the largest temples in Florida. He also was a member of Temple Israel of Greater Miami in Miami and Synagogue Adas Yoshurun in Rockland, Maine.

References 

1922 births
2018 deaths
American philanthropists
Aviators from Florida
Aviators from New Jersey
Bibliophiles
Jewish American philanthropists
Newark Academy alumni
Pennsylvania State University
People from Hoboken, New Jersey
Philanthropists from Florida
Philanthropists from New Jersey
Real estate brokers
University of Florida
University of Miami
Wharton School of the University of Pennsylvania alumni